Soumyam is a 2005 Indian Malayalam film,  directed by Rajesh Nambiar. The film stars Biju Menon, Devayani, Mukesh and Suja Karthika in lead roles. The film had musical score by Kaithapram.

Cast
Biju Menon
Mukesh
Suja Karthika
Sanusha

Accolades
Kerala State Film Award for Best Child Artist - Sanusha (also for Kaazhcha)

References

External links
 

2005 films
2000s Malayalam-language films